Lucas Halter (born 2 May 2000) is a Brazilian footballer who plays as a central defender for Athletico Paranaense.

Career statistics

Club

Notes

Honours
Atlético Paranaense
Campeonato Paranaense: 2019, 2020
J.League Cup / Copa Sudamericana Championship: 2019
Copa do Brasil: 2019

References

External links

2000 births
Living people
Footballers from São Paulo (state)
Brazilian footballers
Association football defenders
Campeonato Brasileiro Série A players
Club Athletico Paranaense players
Brazil youth international footballers